Mayowa Adebayo Adenekan (born 23 October), also known as MayorSpeaks, is a Nigerian talent manager, PR specialist, content creator and critic.

Education 
Adenekan is from Ogun State. He attended Lagos State Model College Merian for his secondary education. And then Federal University of Agriculture, Abeokuta (FUNAAB) and ESTG University, Cotonou. He also attended Lagos State University for his Master's degree in public relations and digital advertising.

Career 
Adenekan started out as an on-air personality during his undergraduate years in Federal University of Agriculture, Abeokuta (FUNAAB). He later sojourned into talent management, managing the likes of Matilda Lambert, VJ Adams, Muyiwa 'Authentic' Ademola, Tierny Olalere and Bukunmi 'Kiekie' Adeaga-Ilori. In his role as public commentator and critic, he lends his voice to contemporary entertainment issues and works in Nigeria. His critique on the 2022 Nollywood movie Glamour Girls was covered by the Leadership newspaper. His critiques on topics like Ruger, Big Brother Naija, Chrisland Schools, Adesua Etomi, Chicken Republic have been covered by several media outlets in Nigeria in the past, including Legit.ng, P.M. News, Business Day, Vanguard, This Day, The Guardian, Independent, amongst others.

He was awarded at the Ogun State Choice Award.

References 

Living people
Nigerian businesspeople
Lagos State University alumni
Yoruba people
Year of birth missing (living people)
People from Ogun State